Kilsyth Football Club, nicknamed Cougars, is an Australian rules football club based in Kilsyth, Victoria, which plays in the Eastern Football League. The club is most notable for its three-year stint in the Victorian Football Association (VFA) second division in the 1980s.

History
The Kilsyth Football Club was formed in 1923, and played initially in the Ringwood District Football League, then later in the Croydon-Ferntree Gully Football League. In 1962, the club was a founding member of the Eastern District Football League, and played there until 1981.

Despite being a small EDFL club and having finished last in the EDFL's second division in 1981, Kilsyth joined the Victorian Football Association second division for the 1982 season as part of the VFA's restructuring and expansion in the early 1980s. The outer north-eastern suburbs were not otherwise represented in the VFA, and Kilsyth hoped that it would be able to attract some of the best local talent out of the EDFL and into its VFA team; but this never happened, and the club endured three seasons in Division 2 with very little success, finishing with a total on-field record of 9 wins and 44 losses. The club still intended to continue in the VFA in 1985, but it withdrew shortly before the season began and returned to the Eastern District Football League in 1986.

As of 2022, the club plays in the Eastern Football League's fourth division.

Club symbols
The club's nickname is the Cougars, and the guernsey is currently black with red sash. In 1983, the club reversed its colours to red with a black sash – partly because of its similarity to the guernsey of VFA Division 1 club Coburg, and partly because the VFA was discouraging its clubs from wearing the same guernsey design as Victorian Football League clubs (Kilsyth's guernsey matched Essendon's). Since 1997, the club has played home matches at Pinks Reserve in Liverpool Road; prior to that, and during its time in the VFA, the club had played at the Kilsyth Recreation Reserve in Colchester Road.

References

Website
Official website

Former Victorian Football League clubs
Australian rules football clubs in Melbourne
Eastern Football League (Australia) clubs
Australian rules football clubs established in 1911
1911 establishments in Australia
Sport in the Shire of Yarra Ranges